Oakland, Ohio may refer to any of several locations in the United States state of Ohio:

 Oakland, Butler County, Ohio
 Oakland, Clinton County, Ohio
 Oakland, Fairfield County, Ohio
 Oakland, Franklin County, Ohio
 Oakland, Jackson County, Ohio
 Oakland, Montgomery County, Ohio